Entre amis is a 2015 French comedy film directed by Olivier Baroux. The film features an ensemble cast that includes Daniel Auteuil, Gérard Jugnot, François Berléand, Zabou Breitman, Mélanie Doutey and Isabelle Gélinas. It was released by Pathé on 22 April 2015.

Cast 
 Daniel Auteuil as Richard  
 Gérard Jugnot as Gilles 
 François Berléand as Philippe
 Zabou Breitman as Astrid  
 Mélanie Doutey as Daphnée  
 Isabelle Gélinas as Carole  
 Justine Bruneau de la Salle as Cathalina   
 Jean-Philippe Ricci as Battistou

References

External links 
 

2015 films
2015 comedy films
2010s French-language films
French comedy films
Pathé films
Films directed by Olivier Baroux
2010s French films